Jettatore is a 1938  Argentine musical drama film directed by Luis Bayon Herrera. The film premiered in Buenos Aires on August 10, 1938 and starred Tito Lusiardo and Pedro Quartucci. It is a tango musical and is based on a play by Gregorio de Laferrere. The cinematography and editing of the film were performed by Francisco Múgica, who also served as a technical advisor to the films.

Cast
Tito Lusiardo
Enrique Serrano
Severo Fernández
Pedro Quartucci
Benita Puértolas
Alita Román
Hilda Sour
Alímedes Nelson
Juan Mangiante
José Alfayate
María Armand
Berta Aliana
Nélida Bilbao
Ely Nolby
Enrique Mara
Amery Darbón

References

External links

1938 films
Argentine musical drama films
1930s Spanish-language films
Argentine black-and-white films
1930s musical drama films
Tango films
Films directed by Luis Bayón Herrera
1938 drama films
1930s Argentine films